Palm Beach Day Academy is a coeducational independent day school located in Palm Beach and West Palm Beach, Florida, U.S.. It enrolls students between age 2 and grade 9.

History
Founded in 1921, Palm Beach Day Academy is the oldest incorporated independent school in Florida.  Palm Beach Day Academy is incorporated as a non-sectarian, not-for-profit school. It has been a member of the National Association of Independent Schools since 1957 and is evaluated and accredited by the Florida Council of Independent Schools and the Florida Kindergarten Council.

It was previously known as the Palm Beach Day School before it merged with the Academy of The Palm Beaches in 2007.

References

External links
 Website
 Private School Review Palm Beach Day Academy

Schools in Palm Beach County, Florida
Private middle schools in Florida
Private elementary schools in Florida
Educational institutions established in 1921
1921 establishments in Florida